"When We Were Us" is a song by American rock band Bon Jovi from their thirteenth studio album, This House Is Not for Sale, the single Included 2018 reissue (bonus tracks). The song was written by Jon Bon Jovi, John Shanks.

Background
Jon Bon Jovi told iHeartRadio:"When We Were Us" is a retrospective song for the band, who is celebrating their incredible 35 year career this year.

Live performances
On February 22, 2018,  Bon Jovi performed the song at Late Show With Stephen Colbert.

Charts

Weekly charts

Year-end charts

References

Bon Jovi songs
2018 songs
2018 singles
Songs written by Jon Bon Jovi
Island Records singles
Songs written by John Shanks